The 1878–79 international cricket season was from September 1878 to March 1879. The match witnessed the first ever Test match hat-rick, when the Australian pacer Fred Spofforth achieved the first Test match hat-trick when he dismissed The Revd Vernon Royle, Francis MacKinnon and Tom Emmett in the first innings.

Season overview

January

England in Australia

References

International cricket competitions by season
1881 in cricket
1882 in cricket